The name Southwest Limited has been used by the following American passenger trains:
a Chicago–Los Angeles train operated by Amtrak, and now known as the Southwest Chief
Southwest Limited formerly operated by the Chicago, Milwaukee, St. Paul and Pacific Railroad ("the Milwaukee Road") between Chicago/Milwaukee and Kansas City
Southwestern Limited was an Illinois Central train, from Meridian, Mississippi to Shreveport, Louisiana, discontinued by 1961
Southwestern Limited was a New York Central train, from New York, New York to St. Louis, Missouri, operating from 1889 to 1966